Frea viossati is a species of beetle in the family Cerambycidae. It was described by Adlbauer in 1994. It is known from Comoros.

Subspecies
 Frea viossati densepunctata Adlbauer, 1994
 Frea viossati viossati Adlbauer, 1994

References

viossati
Beetles described in 1994